高円寺百景, also known as Hundred Sights of Koenji, is the 1994 debut album by the Zeuhl band Koenjihyakkei. The album was released in the USA in 2008 by the American record label Skin Graft Records in a new version where drummer and founding member Tatsuya Yoshida has re-recorded the drums and remixed the entire album.

Track listing
 "Ioss" (3:54)
 "Doi Doi" (6:37)
 "Molavena" (4:32)
 "Gepek" (4:06)
 "Yagonahh" (3:46)
 "Ozone Fall" (4:19)
 "Zhess" (2:10)
 "Zoltan" (4:17)
 "Avedumma" (7:06)
 "Sunna Zarioki" (4:49)

Personnel
Yoshida Tatsuya – drums, vocals
Kuwahara Shigekazu – bass, vocals
Kubota Aki – vocals, keyboards
Masuda Ryuichi – guitars, vocals

References

1994 debut albums
Kōenji Hyakkei albums